"Is This Love" is a song by Bob Marley and the Wailers, released on their 1978 album Kaya. The song became one of the best-known Marley songs and was part of the Legend compilation. It peaked at number 9 in the UK charts upon its release in 1978.  
A live rendition of the song can be found on the Babylon by Bus live album from Paris in 1978.

Music video
A music video was also produced, shot at the Keskidee Arts Centre in London; in the video, future supermodel Naomi Campbell, then seven years old, made her first appearance in the public eye.

Lvndscape and Bolier remix

In June 2016, the song was remixed by Dutch electronic music collaborators Lvndscape and Bolier, and the remix version reached  #16 single in the UK. The music video was released via Spinnin' Records YouTube channel on 17 June 2016.

Notable covers
The following artists have covered the song:
The Pat Travers Band, on their 1980 album Crash and Burn
Carly Simon, on her 1983 album Hello Big Man
Hawaiian reggae music group Three Plus, on their 2003 album 3+ 4 U. That album won the 2003 Na Hoku Hanohano Award for Reggae Album of the Year. Their version of "Is This Love" is also included on the 2010 compilation album Putamayo Presents: Tribute To A Reggae Legend: Bob Marley.
Scott Matthews, as a bonus track on his 2009 album Elsewhere
Corinne Bailey Rae, on the 2011 EP The Love EP. This version was released as a single and won the Grammy Award for Best R&B Performance at the 54th Grammy Awards.

Live covers
Rihanna covered the song during her first worldwide Good Girl Gone Bad Tour (2007—09). The performance is included in her DVD album Good Girl Gone Bad Live.
 Adam Lambert covered the song in an acoustic set in Sydney, Australia, in the summer of 2012, as well as in his 2013 "We Are Glamily" world tour.
 Allen Stone performed the Corinne Bailey Rae version of this song on the tour of his self-titled album, Allen Stone.

In popular culture 
The song is played in the movies In the Name of the Father (1993), Six Days Seven Nights (1998), Lake Placid (1999), 50 First Dates (2004) and Just Go With It (2011).
The song is featured as the theme for the ending credits of Dead or Alive Xtreme Beach Volleyball as well as its sequel, Dead or Alive Xtreme 2.
In the book Marley and Me, author John Grogan says that he and his wife Jenny came up with the name Marley for their dog when, during an argument about what to name him, Jenny walked to the tape deck and pushed play, and the song started playing.
 A reference to the song is made in the lyrics "Just like the song on our radio set / We’ll share the shelter of my single bed" from James Blunt's song "Stay the Night", the first single of the 2010 album Some Kind of Trouble.
 Bon Jovi's song "Lay Your Hands on Me" opens with the lyrics "you're ready, I'm willing, and able. Help me lay my cards down on the table", which bears a clear similarity to the lyrics of "Is This Love".

Charts

"Is This Love"

Weekly charts

Year-end charts

"Is This Love" featuring LVNDSCAPE and Bolier

Certifications

References 

Bob Marley songs
1978 songs
2016 debut singles
Songs written by Bob Marley
Island Records singles